Haraldur Ingólfsson (born 1 August 1970) is an Icelandic former footballer who played at both professional and international levels as a midfielder.

Career

Club career
Ingólfsson played club football in Iceland for ÍA. He spent a loan spell at the Scottish club Aberdeen during the 1996–97 season, making six appearances in the Scottish Football League. Ingólfsson later played in Sweden for IF Elfsborg and in Norway for Raufoss IL.

International career
Ingólfsson earned 20 caps for the Icelandic national side.

Personal life
Ingólfsson is married to Jónína Víglundsdóttir, who has represented the Icelandic women's national side at football.

References

1970 births
Living people
Haraldur Ingolfsson
Haraldur Ingolfsson
Haraldur Ingolfsson
Haraldur Ingolfsson
Aberdeen F.C. players
Scottish Football League players
Expatriate footballers in Scotland
Haraldur Ingolfsson
Allsvenskan players
IF Elfsborg players
Expatriate footballers in Sweden
Haraldur Ingolfsson
Raufoss IL players
Expatriate footballers in Norway
Haraldur Ingolfsson
Association football midfielders